Music of Honduras is very varied. Punta is the main "ritmo" of Honduras with other music such as Paranda, Bachata, Caribbean salsa, cumbia, reggae, merengue, soca, calypso, dancehall and reggaeton widely heard especially in the North, to Mexican rancheras heard in the interior rural part of the country.

Overview
Honduras' capital Tegucigalpa is an important center for modern Honduran music, and is home to the College for Fine Arts.

Folk music is played with guitar, marimba and other instruments. Punta is popular in Honduras. Popular folk songs include La ceiba and Candú.

There is an Orquesta Sinfónica Nacional de Honduras (a national orchestra) in Comayagua.

Notable musicians
 Banda Blanca
 Javier Monthiel
 Anima
 Polache
 Guillermo Anderson
 Moisés Canelo
 URANIA
 Khaos
 El Pez
 Montuca SoundSystem
 Evolucion Neutra
 Delirium
 Sueño Digviana
 Pez Luna
 Sol Caracol
 Maria Isolina
 Dano Cube
 Atomic Rose
 Tux Lunan
 Chia Casanova
 Nelson Padilla
 Sam & Dan
 Most Dangerous City
 Eduardo Umanzor
 Rodolfo Bueso
 LAUREN SOFÍA
 Sergio Ortega
 Volmen

Reggaeton has been popular in the country for many years, and Honduras has emerged as a leading producer of artists. Notable artists include:
 DJ Sy (Syrome)
 Raggamofin Killas
 El Pueblo
 Los Bohemios Del Reggaeton
 DJ Slyfox 
 Bullaka Family
 Yerbaklan
 Killa

See also

 Music of Costa Rica
 Music of Peru
 Music of Guatemala
 Music of Panama
 Music of Puerto Rico
 Music of Mexico
 Music of Brazil

References

Further reading
 Campos Fonseca, Susan: “Historia compensatoria y Filosofía: Un caso centroamericano”, en BABAB, Nº33, verano, España, 2008, ISSN · 1575-9385. Disponible en:
Brill, Mark. Music of Latin America and the Caribbean, 2nd Edition, 2018. Taylor & Francis 
 http://www.babab.com/no33/susan_campos.php